The 1998 FIA GT Hockenheim 500 km was the third round the 1998 FIA GT Championship season.  It took place at the Hockenheimring, Germany, on June 28, 1998.

Official results
Class winners are in bold.  Cars failing to complete 70% of winner's distance are marked as Not Classified (NC).

Statistics
 Pole position – #1 AMG Mercedes – 1:57.571
 Fastest lap – #1 AMG Mercedes – 2:00.333
 Average speed – 197.740 km/h

References

 
 
 

H
Hockenheim 500